Borowce refers to the following places in Poland:

 Borowce, Masovian Voivodeship
 Borowce, Silesian Voivodeship